Petrus Verbaeten, born April 23rd, usually called Pierre, is a Belgian professor emeritus in the Computer Science Department at the KU Leuven, and has more than 226 publications to its name. He managed the internet domain field .be from 1989 to 2000.

Biography 
Verbaeten studied electronics at Katholieke Universiteit Leuven and graduated in 1969. The direction computer science was founded in 1971. His first contact with computer science was during his military service. He then followed Applied Mathematics, in which a few computer science fields occurred.

Functions 
 Former chairman of the Department of Computer Science at the Katholieke Universiteit Leuven
 Chairman of the Board of Directors EURid of 2004
 Member in the DistriNet research group at KU Leuven
 Administrator of the top-level domain .be between 1989 and 2000
 Member DNS.be of 2000
 Professor at KU Leuven since 1982

References

External links 
 Pierre Verbaeten on be.linkedin.com
 Interview Beyond the beginning of .be

Belgian computer scientists
Academic staff of KU Leuven
KU Leuven alumni
Living people
Year of birth missing (living people)